Scott Reid may refer to:

Scott Reid (politician) (born 1964), Conservative Party of Canada MP
Scott Reid (political advisor), advisor to former Canadian Prime Minister Paul Martin
Scott Reid (Newfoundland and Labrador politician), MHA in Newfoundland and Labrador
Scott Reid (baseball) (1947–2021), American baseball player and scout
Scott Reid (ice hockey) (born 1976), Canadian hockey goalie from the Central Hockey League

See also
Scott Reed (disambiguation)